Pieve di Bono is a frazione of the commune of Pieve di Bono-Prezzo, in the Trentino-Alto Adige/Südtirol, northern Italy, located about  southwest of Trento.

Former municipalities of Trentino